Människor som du och jag is a studio album by Peter Jöback, released 19 September 2007.

Track listing
 Intro
 Balladen om det angenäma livet
 Han är med mig nu (with Annika Norlin)
 Stockholm i natt
 Charlies tema
 Sen du åkte bort
 Inget vi får vill gå på toa
 Hur hamnade jag här
 Jag sjöng varje sång för dig
 Under morgonljuset
 Stoppa mig
 Jag ångrar ingenting jag gjort
 Tänk om jag hade fel
 Juni, juli, augusti

Contributors
Peter Jöback - vocals, vibraphone, tubular bells, composer, lyrics
Andreas Mattsson guitar, composer, lyrics
Niclas Frisk - guitar, composer, lyrics
Ricard Nettermalm - drums, percussion, guitar
Rickard Nilsson - organ, spinet, piano, wurlitzer, celesta, synthesizer, piano
Sven Lindvall - bass
Peter Kvint - producer
Svea Strings - musicians

Chart positions

References

2007 albums
Peter Jöback albums